Silkman may refer to:

 Barry Silkman (born 1952), English footballer
 Silkman House, a historic house located in Pennsylvania, USA